Flight 11 or Flight 011 may refer to:
Continental Airlines Flight 11, suicide-bombed and crashed near Unionville, Missouri on May 22, 1962
SAETA Flight 011, crashed on April 23, 1979 after unsuccessfully reaching its destination and its wreckage being located five years later
Avianca Flight 011, crashed while attempting to land at Madrid on November 27, 1983
American Airlines Flight 11, hijacked and crashed into the World Trade Center in New York on September 11, 2001
Air Bagan Flight 011, struck power lines and crash-landed on final approach to Heho, Myanmar on December 25, 2012

0011